is a former Japanese football player.

Playing career
Okamoto was born in Hyogo Prefecture on April 9, 1976. After graduating from high school, he joined Japan Football League club Vissel Kobe based in his local in 1995. The club won the 2nd place in 1996 and was promoted to J1 League from 1997. However he could hardly play in the match and retired end of 1998 season.

Club statistics

References

External links

1976 births
Living people
Association football people from Hyōgo Prefecture
Japanese footballers
J1 League players
Japan Football League (1992–1998) players
Vissel Kobe players
Association football midfielders